Cazenovia College is a private college in Cazenovia, New York. Founded as the Genesee Seminary in 1824 and sponsored by the Methodist Church, in 1894 the college adopted the name of Cazenovia Seminary. It was reorganized in 1942 after church sponsorship was withdrawn and was Cazenovia College for Women from 1961 to 1982, when the college became co-educational again. It will close after the 2022-2023 academic year due to poor finances.

History 

Cazenovia College began in 1824 as the Genesee Seminary and was the second Methodist seminary to be established in the United States. Between 1904 and 1931, it functioned as a secondary school for local young people, an arrangement that ended when Cazenovia Central High School was built. It was sponsored by the Methodist Church but was a non-sectarian institution. It was initially located in the old Madison County Courthouse. Cazenovia was co-educational from its foundation. The seminary was created at the instigation of George Peck and several other prominent clergymen in the area.  In 1839, the seminary initiated a three year course, as it was called, which was focused at the education of women.  The seminary also had a missionary course, and in 1843 Sophronia Farrington (class of 1828) went out as the first female missionary to Africa, under the auspices of the Young Men's Missionary Society of Boston. This was the earliest foreign mission established by the Methodist Episcopal Church.

Later the institution was known as Cazenovia Seminary. It was known as the Oneida and Genesee Conference Seminary, the Oneida Conference Seminary, and the Central New York Conference Seminary over the years. It did not officially adopt the name Cazenovia Seminary until 1894 but the name was at times used from its inception and is often used to refer to it at any time before it became a college.

In 1942 church sponsorship of Cazenovia was withdrawn and it was reorganized to include a junior college program as well as the prep school with the name of Cazenovia Junior College. It then became Cazenovia College for Women in 1961. In 1982 it returned to being co-educational and adopted its present name, Cazenovia College, although it was not recognized as a bachelor's degree-granting institution until 1988. In 2019 it began its first graduate program, a Master of Science in Clinical Mental Health Counseling.

In September 2022, after a failed attempt to refinance debt, the college defaulted on a $25 million bond payment. On December 7, 2022, it was announced that the school would permanently close after the 2022-2023 academic year. Poor finances was cited as the main reason for this closure.

Athletics 
The Cazenovia athletic teams are called the Wildcats. The college is a member of the NCAA Division III ranks, primarily competing in the North Atlantic Conference (NAC) since the 2020–21 academic year. The Wildcats previously competed in the North Eastern Athletic Conference (NEAC; now currently known as the United East Conference (UEC)) from 2004–05 to 2019–20.

Cazenovia competes in 16 intercollegiate varsity sports: Men's sports include baseball, basketball, cross country, golf, lacrosse, soccer and swimming & diving; while women's sports include basketball, cross country, golf, lacrosse, soccer, softball, swimming & diving and volleyball; and co-ed sports include eSports. Former sports included men's crew, equestrian, tennis and volleyball; and women's cheerleading, crew, equestrian and tennis

Notable alumni 
 Lisle C. Carter - First President of the University of the District of Columbia (UDC)
 Carole Cole - CEO of King Cole Productions
 Lucinda L. Combs - First female physician to serve in China for the Women's Foreign Ministry Society 
 Sophronia Farrington Cone - First female missionary to Africa
 Nathan Smith Davis - First editor of the Journal of the American Medical Association 
 Wallace B. Douglas - Minnesota lawyer, judge, and state representative
 L. Fidelia Woolley Gillette - One of the first women to be ordained Universalist minister in the United States and the first woman ordained of any denomination in Canada
 Joseph B. Hamilton - Wisconsin lawyer, judge, and state senator
 Lewis Hartsough - Methodist minister and gospel song writer/composer
 Joseph E. Irish - Wisconsin clergyman and state senator
 William C. McDonald - Governor of New Mexico
 John Philip Newman - Bishop of the Methodist Episcopal Church; previously three times the Chaplain of the United States Senate
 John W. North - Pioneer statesman and founder of Riverside, California
 Daniel D. Pratt - United States Senator from Indiana
 Rodney S. Rose - Pastor, father of Bayonne Whipple
 Leland Stanford - Industrialist, co-founder of Central Pacific Railroad; Governor of California and U.S. Senator; founder of Stanford University
 James Wilson Seaton - American lawyer and legislator
 Harvey A. Truesdell - New York businessman and assemblyman
 Jimmy Van Heusen - American songwriter
 Daniel C. Van Norman – Canadian educator, clergyman, and school founder
 David F. Wilber - United States Representative from New York
 Barbara W. Woodlee - Former president of Kennebec Valley Community College, the first female president in both the state technical college and community college systems

References

External links 

 
 Official athletics website
 The Bonnie Monroe Fashion Illustration Collection from Cazenovia College on New York Heritage Digital Collections

 
Universities and colleges in Madison County, New York
Private universities and colleges in New York (state)
Educational institutions established in 1824
1824 establishments in New York (state)
Liberal arts colleges in New York (state)
Cazenovia, New York